Anthony Stewart Head (born 20 February 1954) is an English actor and singer. Primarily a performer in musical theatre, he rose to fame in the UK in the 1980s following his role in the Gold Blend couple television advertisements for Nescafé, which led to major roles in several television series. He is best known for his roles as Rupert Giles in Buffy the Vampire Slayer (1997–2003), the Prime Minister in Little Britain (2003–2006), and Uther Pendragon in Merlin (2008–2012), as well as voicing Herc Shipwright in BBC Radio 4's Cabin Pressure.

Early life
Head was born in Camden Town, London. His father was Seafield Laurence Stewart Murray Head (20 August 1919 – 22 March 2009), a documentary filmmaker and a founder of Verity Films, and his mother was actress Helen Shingler (29 August 1919 – 8 October 2019); they married in 1944 in Watford. His older brother is actor/singer Murray Head. Both brothers have played the part of Freddie Trumper in the musical Chess at the Prince Edward Theatre, London, with Murray a part of the original cast in 1986, while Anthony was in the final cast in 1989.

Head was educated at Sunbury Grammar School and London Academy of Music and Dramatic Art (LAMDA). In discussing why he chose acting as a career, in an interview in 2013 he said that "When it's in your family, it's a choice, it's there. It's not a jump to say: 'I want to act.' When I was six I was in a little show my mother's friends organised, playing the Emperor in The Emperor's New Clothes. I remember thinking: 'This is the business, this is what I want to do.'"

Career

1970s to 1990s
His first role was in the musical Godspell; this led to roles in television on both BBC and ITV, one of his earliest being an appearance in the series Enemy at the Door (ITV, 1978–1980). In the early 1980s he provided backing vocals for the band Red Box. As well he was Featured in the album Face in the Window (1983) by Two way.

In the late 1980s, he appeared in a storyline series of twelve coffee commercials with Sharon Maughan for Nescafé Gold Blend. (A version made for North America featured the American brand name Taster's Choice.) The soap opera nature of the commercials brought him wider recognition, along with a part in the Children's ITV comedy drama Woof!

Head played Frank N. Furter in the 1990–91 West End revival of The Rocky Horror Show at London's Piccadilly Theatre, with Craig Ferguson as Brad Majors. In 1991 Head's rendition of "Sweet Transvestite" was released as a single by Chrysalis Records. Head played the role again in the summer of 1995 at London's Duke of York's Theatre, a 3 May 2006 tribute show at London's Royal Court Theatre, and a 14 October 2000 production at the Hard Rock Hotel and Casino, Las Vegas, Nevada.

Success on the stage and a number of brief appearances on American television, such as in the short-lived VR.5, led to accepting the role of Rupert Giles in Buffy the Vampire Slayer in 1997. For this role he lived full-time in the United States during the late 1990s and early 2000s, although his family continued to live in the UK. Head left the regular cast of Buffy during the show's sixth season and subsequently appeared several times as a guest star through the conclusion of the series. In many interviews at the time, Head said he left the show to spend more time with his family, having realised that he had spent most of the year outside Britain, which added up to more than half his youngest daughter's life.In 1985 Head appeared as the character Phil Norton in Howards' Way as one of Lynne Howard's (Tracey Childs) love interests.

2000s
In 2002, he co-starred in the BBC Two television series Manchild, a show revolving around four friends approaching their fifties who try to recapture their fading youth and vitality while dealing with life as 'mature' men. He also appeared in guest roles in various other dramas, such as Silent Witness, Murder Investigation Team, and Spooks. He appeared in the 4th series of the British hit sitcom My Family in 2003 playing one of the main characters' (Abi's) father in the episode "May the Best Man Win". He was featured as the Prime Minister in the popular BBC comedy sketch show Little Britain from 2003 to 2005, and guest starred in several episodes of the 2004 series of popular drama Monarch of the Glen.

Outside television work, he has released an album of songs with musician George Sarah entitled Music for Elevators. Early in his career he provided vocals for some of the tracks on the Chris de Burgh album The Getaway and the reading from The Tempest on "Don't Pay the Ferryman".

In 2001, he appeared in a special webcast version of Doctor Who, a story called Death Comes to Time, in which he played the Time Lord Valentine. He also guest starred in the Excelis Trilogy, a series of Doctor Who audio adventures produced by Big Finish Productions, and in 2005 narrated the two-part documentary Project: WHO?, detailing the television revival of the series, for BBC Radio 2 (and released to CD in 2006 by BBC Audio). In April 2006 he appeared as a school's alien headmaster, Mr. Finch, in an episode of the second series entitled "School Reunion". Soon after, he recorded an abridged audio book of the Doctor Who novel The Nightmare of Black Island by Mike Tucker. He narrated the third and fourth series of Doctor Who Confidential. He also voiced the character Baltazar, Scourge of the Universe (an evil space pirate searching for the Infinite) in the first ever animated Doctor Who special, "The Infinite Quest". Head had previously auditioned for the role of the Eighth Doctor for the 1996 television film, but lost out to Paul McGann.

In early 2006, he appeared in an episode of Hotel Babylon, a BBC One drama set in a hotel, in which he played a suicidal man who recovers and lands a music deal. The same year he filmed a pilot for a new show entitled Him and Us, loosely based on the life of openly gay rock star Elton John, for American TV channel ABC, co-starring Kim Cattrall. In July he appeared as Captain Hook at the Children's Party at the Palace, a live pantomime staged in the grounds of Buckingham Palace as part of Queen Elizabeth II's 80th birthday celebrations. In October 2006, he voiced Ponsonby, leader of MI6, in Destroy All Humans! 2.

At Comic-Con International in 2007, Joss Whedon said talks were almost completed for a 90-minute Buffy the Vampire Slayer spin-off, Ripper, as a BBC special, with both Head and the BBC on board. In 2007, he portrayed Stockard Channing's gay brother in the English film Sparkle and appeared as Mr. Colubrine in the ITV1 comedy drama Sold. Head also appeared as Sir Walter Elliot in Persuasion. Head also narrated a BBC behind-the-scenes programme for the American television series Heroes, Heroes Unmasked. He has also been seen as Maurice Riley in the BBC drama The Invisibles alongside Warren Clarke.

After seeing Anthony Head in the Buffy musical episode, "Once More With Feeling", Saw director Darren Lynn Bousman cast him in his 21st century rock opera, Repo! The Genetic Opera. Head portrays an organ repossessor, employed by a fictional dystopian medical firm; "Anthony Head was my number one choice for Repo Man from the very beginning", said Bousman in an interview shortly before the film's release on 7 November 2008. The film also stars Sarah Brightman and Paris Hilton.

Head has also performed for radio, taking two of the lead roles—arch-villain Mr. Gently Benevolent, and his descendant, journalist Jeremy Sourquill—in the BBC Radio 4 comedy series, Bleak Expectations (five series, 2007–12). He also had a significant recurring role in the last two series (2011–13) of the Radio 4 sitcom Cabin Pressure as Hercules Shipwright, a romantic interest for the airline CEO played by Stephanie Cole, and returned for show's two-part finale in 2014.

Head was part of the regular cast of the BBC drama series Merlin, about the mythical wizard Merlin. Head played King Uther Pendragon, the father of Prince Arthur.

2010s
Head also provided voice-over work for the Nintendo Wii video game Flip's Twisted World, developed by Frozen North Productions. For his acting in the film Despite the Falling Snow he won the Best Supporting Actor award at the 2016 Prague Independent Film Festival. In July 2018 Head was added to the cast of long-running BBC radio soap-opera The Archers, playing Robin Fairbrother, member of a family with several past and current connections to the Archers themselves.

Personal life
Head lives in Bath, Somerset with his partner, Sarah Fisher. They have two daughters, Emily and Daisy, both of whom are actresses.

Filmography

Film

Television

Radio

Stage

Video games

Music
 Face in the Window – EP (1983 album) with his band Two way
 "Sweet Transvestite" (1991 single) Chrysalis Records, 7-inch single, 12-inch single, CD single, and shaped picture CD
 Music for Elevators (2002 album) in collaboration with George Sarah
 Once More, with Feeling (2001 album) Buffy the Vampire Slayer
 "Cry" (2012 single) written by Marina Florance for the Oldie Composers Competition
 Staring at the Sun (2014 album) solo album of both covers and original work

References

External links

 BFI.org, Anthony Head at the British Film Institute
 
 Watch Anthony Head in the short film Amelia and Michael
 

Articles and interviews
Who's Head of the class, BBC Where I Live: Somerset (December 2006)
Interview: Anthony Head, Helen Otter, BBC Where I Live: Somerset (April 2006)
Anthony Head Interview: King Arthur Screwed Up My Nintendo, TheTorchOnline.com (June 2009)
Biographies of Giles and Head at "Buffyguide"

1954 births
Living people
Male actors from London
English male film actors
English male radio actors
English male television actors
English male voice actors
People from Camden Town
Alumni of the London Academy of Music and Dramatic Art
20th-century English male actors
21st-century English male actors